Tomáš Požár (born 9 September 1975) is a retired Czech football defender. He played in the Gambrinus liga for numerous clubs, making over 50 league appearances in total. In 2012, he was working as sporting director for the youth team of Bohemians 1905. In 2015, he became chief of scouting at AC Sparta Prague and in October 2016 Sparta's new sporting director.

Požár played international football at under-21 level for Czech Republic U21.

References

External links

1975 births
Living people
Czech footballers
Czech Republic youth international footballers
Czech Republic under-21 international footballers
Czech First League players
AC Sparta Prague players
FK Jablonec players
FK Teplice players
Association football defenders
Czech football managers
AC Sparta Prague managers